Dame Roma Flinders Mitchell,  (2 October 1913 – 5 March 2000) was an Australian lawyer, judge and state governor. She was the first woman to hold a number of positions in Australia – the country's first woman judge, the first woman to be a Queen's Counsel, a chancellor of an Australian university and the Governor of an Australian state.

Mitchell was considered to be a pioneer of the Australian women's rights movement. Her grandfather, Samuel James Mitchell, was the first Chief Justice of the Northern Territory.

Early life and education
Roma Mitchell was born in Adelaide, South Australia, on 2 October 1913, the second daughter and youngest child of Harold and Maude Mitchell (née Wickham). She was an alumna of St Aloysius Convent College, Adelaide and the University of Adelaide.

Career
Mitchell was admitted as a barrister in 1935. In 1962, she was appointed a Queen's Counsel. As well as a practicing barrister, Mitchell was a lecturer in family law at the University of Adelaide and Margaret Nyland was one of her students, with Mitchell becoming a mentor to Nyland. Mitchell was made the first female Justice of the Supreme Court of South Australia in 1965, at the recommendation of Don Dunstan, South Australia's 38th Attorney-General. She was still the only female judge in South Australia when she retired 18 years later in 1983, although Justices Elizabeth Evatt and Mary Gaudron had been appointed to federal courts by the Whitlam government. It was not until 1993 that the second woman was appointed to the court, Mitchell's former student Margaret Nyland.

Mitchell was Governor of South Australia from 1991 to 1996, Chancellor of the University of Adelaide from 1983 to 1990 and was a member of the Council for the Order of Australia from 1981 to 1990.

Honours

Mitchell was appointed a Commander of the Order of the British Empire (CBE) on 12 June 1971. She was raised to Dame Commander of the Order of the British Empire (DBE) on 12 June 1982.

On 26 January 1991, Mitchell was appointed a Companion of the Order of Australia (AC), Australia's highest civilian honour, for services to the law, to learning, and to the community. She was made a Commander of the Royal Victorian Order (CVO) on 1 January 2000. Mitchell was to receive her honour directly from The Queen of Australia, however, as her health deteriorated, the Governor-General, Sir William Deane, flew to Adelaide and attended her bedside to bestow the honour in a private investiture.

Roma Mitchell Secondary College in northern Adelaide was named for Dame Roma, as was Roma Mitchell House, on North Terrace, Adelaide. One of the Bay class patrol boats operated by the Australian Customs is named ACV Dame Roma Mitchell. A statue of Dame Roma, in Prince Henry Gardens, directly outside Government House, Adelaide, was erected in 1999.

See also
 First women lawyers around the world

References

External links

South Australian history
Bob Hawke Prime Ministerial Centre
ABC Behind The News dedication to Roma Mitchell
Women & Politics in South Australia
Biography of Roma Mitchell
John Howard's dedication to Roma Mitchell
Mitchell Chambers
"Glimpses of a Glorious Life"

1913 births
2000 deaths
Australian Dames Commander of the Order of the British Empire
Australian King's Counsel
Australian Roman Catholics
Australian Commanders of the Royal Victorian Order
Deaths from cancer in South Australia
Chancellors of the University of Adelaide
Companions of the Order of Australia
Deaths from bone cancer
Governors of South Australia
Judges of the Supreme Court of South Australia
Australian women judges
Lawyers from Adelaide
20th-century King's Counsel
Adelaide Law School alumni